Events from the year 1970 in France.

Incumbents
 President: Georges Pompidou 
 Prime Minister: Jacques Chaban-Delmas

Events
10 February – An avalanche at Val d'Isère kills 39 tourists.
8 March – Cantonales Elections held.
15 March – Cantonales Elections held.
25 March – Concorde makes its first supersonic flight (700 mph/1127 km/h).
11 April – 74 people, mostly young boys, die as an avalanche buries a tuberculosis sanatorium in the French Alps.
19 May – Barbapapa was created by Annette Tison and Talus Taylor.
6 October – President Georges Pompidou visits the Soviet Union.
11 October – Eleven French soldiers are killed in a shootout with rebels in Chad.
1 November – Club Cinq-Sept fire in Saint-Laurent-du-Pont, Isère, kills 146.
Undated
Citroen launches two new models: the GS family saloon and estate, and the SM sporting coupe. The Citroen GS is voted European Car of the Year.
Establishment of Parc naturel régional de Camargue.

Sport
27 June – Tour de France begins.
19 July – Tour de France ends, won by Eddy Merckx of Belgium.

Births

January to March
10 January – Christine Malèvre, serial killer.
28 January – Laurent Levesque, film score composer.
29 January – Olivier Edmond, golfer.
3 February – Franck Gava, soccer player.
6 February – Patrice Loko, soccer player.
14 February – Guillaume Raoux, tennis player.
17 February – Philippe Bernat-Salles, international rugby union player.
4 March – Amélie Sarn, author, comic book writer and translator.
7 March – Nathalie Lancien, cyclist and Olympic gold medallist.
12 March – Marine Delterme, actress, painter, sculptor and former model.
13 March – Stéphane Goubert, cyclist.
21 March – Franck David, sailor and Olympic gold medallist.
27 March – Gedeon Naudet, filmmaker.
28 March – Benjamin Castaldi, television personality

April to June
10 April – Christophe Honoré, writer and film director.
14 April – Richard Sainct, Rally Raid Motorcycle rider (d.2004).
15 April – Luc Marquet, volleyball player.
24 April – Jean-Philippe Belloc, motor racing driver.
3 May – Alexia Dechaume-Balleret, tennis player.
5 May – Laurent Crost, judoka.
13 May – Wilfrid Boulineau, decathlete.
21 May – Pierre Billaud, radio reporter and journalist, killed in Afghanistan (d.2001).
22 May – Guillaume Warmuz, soccer player.
15 June – Gaëlle Méchaly, soprano.
18 June – Ludovic Pollet, soccer player.
27 June – Régine Cavagnoud, alpine skier (d.2001).
27 June – Christophe Deguerville, soccer player.
30 June – Emmanuel Mouret, actor, director and screenwriter

July to September
9 July – Benoit Pierre Emery, fashion designer.
18 August – Cédric Vasseur, cyclist.
20 August – Loïc De Kergret, volleyball player.
28 August – Loïc Leferme, free diver (d.2007).
3 September – Franck Chambilly, judoka.
6 September – Stéphane Guivarc'h, international soccer player.
9 September – Pierre Laigle, soccer player.
10 September – Julie Halard-Decugis, tennis player.
18 September – Didier Rous, cyclist.
22 September – Emmanuel Petit, soccer player.

October to December
23 October – Stéphane Nomis, judoka.
27 October – Alain Boghossian, soccer player.
5 November – Laurent D'Jaffo, soccer player.
11 November – Gilles Grimandi, soccer player.
15 November – Franck Rabarivony, soccer player.
25 November – Bruno Girard, boxer.
13 December – Pierre Laurent, soccer player.
15 December – Corinne Favre, ski mountaineer and mountain runner.
30 December – Frédéric Tatarian, soccer player.

Full date unknown
Julien Lourau, jazz saxophonist.
Vincent Paronnaud, comics artist and filmmaker.

Deaths

January to March
4 January – Jean-Étienne Valluy, general (b. 1899).
8 January – Georges Guibourg, French actor, singer, and playwright (b. 1891)
20 January – François Tanguy-Prigent, politician and resistance fighter (b. 1909).
25 January – Jane Bathori, opera singer (b. 1877).
29 January – Marie-Laure de Noailles, patron of the arts (b. 1902).
1 February – Eugène Christophe, cyclist (b. 1885).
20 February – Gaston Modot, actor (b. 1887).
17 March – Jérôme Carcopino, historian and author (b. 1881).
22 March – Georges Malkine, painter (b. 1898).

April to June
10 April – Henri Marchal, archaeologist (b. 1876).
22 May – Georges Limbour, writer (b. 1900).
23 May – René Capitant, lawyer and politician (b. 1901).
2 June – Albert Lamorisse, filmmaker, producer and writer (b. 1922).
6 June – Camille Bombois, naïve painter (b. 1883).
15 June – Henri Queuille, Radical-Socialist politician and Prime Minister of France (b. 1884).
16 June – Elsa Triolet, writer (b. 1896).
27 June – Pierre Mac Orlan, novelist and songwriter (b. 1882).

July to September
10 July – Félix Gaillard, Radical politician and Prime Minister of France (b. 1919).
11 July – André Lurçat, architect (b. 1894).
19 July – Henri Lauvaux, athlete and Olympic medallist (b. 1900).
30 July – Jean d'Eaubonne, art director (b. 1903).
5 August – Lucien Lamoureux, politician and Minister (b. 1888).
25 August – Marcel Allain, writer (b. 1885).
1 September – François Mauriac, author, winner of the Nobel Prize in Literature (b. 1885).
2 September – Marie Pierre Kœnig, general and politician (b. 1898).
5 September – André Simon, wine merchant, gourmet and writer (b. 1877).
23 September – Bourvil, actor and singer (b. 1917).

October to December
8 October – Jean Giono, author (b. 1895).
9 October – Edmond Michelet, politician (b. 1899).
10 October – Édouard Daladier, Radical-Socialist politician and Prime Minister of France (b. 1884).
18 October – Jean De Briac, actor (b. 1891).
2 November – Pierre Veyron, motor racing driver (b. 1903).
6 November – Henri Jeanson, writer and journalist (b. 1900).
9 November – Charles de Gaulle, general, statesman, President (b. 1890).
1 December – Hermine David, painter (b. 1886).
7 December – Émile Girardeau, engineer (b. 1882).
16 December – Laurent Eynac, politician and Minister (b. 1886).
18 December – Marc Boegner, theologist, pastor, French Resistance member and essayist (d.1881).

Full date unknown
Lucienne Abraham, Trotskyist politician (b. 1916).
Maurice Lafforgue, alpine skier (b. 1913).

See also
 List of French films of 1970

References

1970s in France